, better known as Damo Suzuki (ダモ鈴木), is a Japanese musician who has been living in Germany since the early 1970s and is best known as the former lead singer of the krautrock group Can.

Biography
As a teenager, Suzuki spent the late 1960s wandering around Europe, often busking.

When Malcolm Mooney left Can after recording their first album Monster Movie, Holger Czukay and Jaki Liebezeit encountered Suzuki busking in Munich, Germany, whilst the two were sitting outside at a street café. They invited him to join the group, and he did, performing with them that evening.

Suzuki was with Can from 1970 to 1973, recording a number of well-regarded albums such as Tago Mago, Future Days and Ege Bamyası. Suzuki's first vocal performance with Can was "Don't Turn the Light On, Leave Me Alone" from Soundtracks. His freeform, often improvised lyrics, were sung in no particular language. Suzuki departed from the band in 1973, and took a hiatus from music for the following decade while working other jobs.

He returned to music in 1983, and currently leads what is known as "Damo Suzuki's Network" – as he tours, he performs live improvisational music with various local musicians, so-called "Sound Carriers".

The Fall's 1985 album This Nation's Saving Grace features a song "I Am Damo Suzuki", inspired by the singer. The rock band The Mooney Suzuki takes its name from Damo Suzuki and Can's earlier vocalist Malcolm Mooney.

Since 1997 he has been touring or playing separate gigs.

Personal life 
Suzuki lives in Cologne, although he has played more shows in the United Kingdom and has stated that British audiences are more receptive to his music than German ones.

He met his wife Elke Morsbach in Cologne in 1985. Suzuki was diagnosed with colon cancer in 2014. The documentary Energy explores Suzuki's battle with cancer and relationship with Morsbach.

During his hiatus from music, Suzuki became a Jehovah's Witness, but later left the organisation and now considers himself a believer in the Bible without being a member of any denomination or church.

Discography
Damo Suzuki performs on the following albums:

 Can – Soundtracks (1970)
 Can – Tago Mago (1971)
 Can – Ege Bamyası (1972)
 Can – Future Days (1973)
 Can – Unlimited Edition (1976) (Compilation)
 Dunkelziffer – In The Night (1984)
 Dunkelziffer – III (1986)
 Can – The Peel Sessions (1995)
 Dunkelziffer – Live (1985 (1997)
 Damo Suzuki's Network – Tokyo on Air West 30.04.97 (1997)
 Damo Suzuki's Network – Tokyo on Air West 02.05.97 (1997)
 Damo Suzuki's Network – Osaka Muse Hall 04.05.97 (1997)
 Damo Suzuki Band – V.E.R.N.I.S.S.A.G.E. (1998)
 Damo Suzuki Band – P.R.O.M.I.S.E. (7CD Box) (1998)
 Damo Suzuki's Network – Seattle (1999)
 Damo Suzuki's Network – Odyssey (2000)
 Damo Suzuki's Network – JPN ULTD Vol.1 (2000)
 Damo Suzuki's Network – Metaphysical Transfer (2001)
 Damo Suzuki's Network – JPN ULTD Vol.2 (2002)
 Cul De Sac / Damo Suzuki – Abhayamudra (2004)
 Sixtoo – Chewing on Glass & Other Miracle Cures (2004)
 Damo Suzuki's Network – Hollyaris (2005) (2×CD)
 Damo Suzuki's Network – 3 Dead People After The Performance (2005)
 Damo Suzuki & Now – The London Evening News (2006) (CD)
 Damo Suzuki's Network –  Tutti i colori del silenzio –  (2006) (CD)
 Omar Rodriguez-Lopez & Damo Suzuki – Please Heat This Eventually (2007)
 Safety Magic – Voices (2007)
 Audioscope – Music for a Good Home (2010 (CD)
 Damo Suzuki & The Holy Soul – Dead Man Has No 2nd Chance (2010) (CD)
 Damo Suzuki & Cuzo – Puedo Ver Tu Mente (2011) (CD/LP)
 Damo Suzuki & Congelador – Damo Suzuki + Congelador (2011)
 Damo Suzuki & God Don't Like It Ensemble – Live At Cafe Oto (2011)
 Radio Massacre International – Lost in Transit 4: DAMO (2010) (CD)
 Can – The Lost Tapes (2012) (Compilation)
 Simon Torssell Lerin / Bettina Hvidevold Hystad with Damo Suzuki – Simon Torssell Lerin / Bettina Hvidevold Hystad with Damo Suzuki (2013) (Vinyl Box Set including Book and LP)
 Damo Suzuki – Seven Potatoes: Live in Nanaimo (2×LP) (2013) 
 Damo Suzuki & Øresund Space Collective – Damo Suzuki møder Øresund Space Collective (2014) (Digital and 3×LP) 
 Damo Suzuki & Mugstar – Start From Zero (2015) (LP)
 1-A Düsseldorf – Uraan (2016) (2×CD, Album)
 Damo Suzuki & Black Midi – Live at the Windmill Brixton with 'Sound Carriers''' (2018) (Digital)
 Mugstar & Damo Suzuki – Live at The Invisible Wind Factory (2020) (Digital and LP. Released by The Weird Beard)
 Damo Suzuki & Jelly Planet – Glocksee (2020) (2×LP. Released by Catweezle Records) 
 Damo Suzuki, Echo Ensemble – Live at the Green Door Store (2020) (CD. Released by Willkommen Records) 
 Damo Suzuki with Numinous Eye & Steve Eto – High School Pharmacy!!! (2021) (LP. Released by Charnel Music)
 Damo Suzuki & Spiritczualic Enhancement Center – Arkaoda (2022) (LP. Released by Akuphone)

VideographyRomantic Warriors IV: Krautrock'' (2019)

References

External links

Official Site
Interview with Spike Magazine, February 2005
Interview with The Guardian, October 2022

1950 births
Japanese expatriates in Germany
Japanese male rock singers
Living people
Japanese buskers
Can (band) members
German rock singers
German male singers
Musicians from Kanagawa Prefecture
Japanese Christians
Former Jehovah's Witnesses